was a town located in Yuri District, Akita Prefecture, Japan.

In 2003, the town had an estimated population of 9,368 and a density of 51.55 persons per km². The total area was 181.71 km².

On March 22, 2005, Ōuchi, along with the city of Honjō; and the towns of Chōkai, Higashiyuri, Iwaki, Nishime, Yashima and Yuri (all from Yuri District), merged to create the city of Yurihonjō.

Education 
 Dewa Junior High School (出羽中学校) is a public school located in the Ōuchi town. (140 students, 2008)
 Ōuchi Junior High School (大内中学校) is a public school located 15 minutes drive east of Ōuchi town. (111 students, 2008)
 Iwaya Elementary School (岩谷小学校) (218 students, 2008)
 Shimokawa Elementary School (下川小学校) (118 students, 2008) 
 Kamikawa Elementary School (上川小学校) (82 students, 2008)

External links
Yurihonjō official website 

Dissolved municipalities of Akita Prefecture
Yurihonjō